Alex Carrington (born June 19, 1987) is a former American football defensive end. He was drafted by the Bills in the third round of the 2010 NFL Draft. He played college football at Arkansas State. He has also played for the Buffalo Bills, St. Louis Rams, and Houston Texans.

High school
Carrington attended Tupelo High School in his hometown of Tupelo, Mississippi. He recorded 84 tackles, six sacks and forced three fumbles as a senior, and was named to the all-region team. His only scholarship offer came from Arkansas State, which he accepted.

College career
With the Red Wolves, Carrington was named the Sun Belt Defensive Player of the Year following the 2008 season after he made 10.5 sacks and 19 tackles for loss in 12 games. In his senior season, he recorded 41 tackles, including 14.5 for loss, and nine sacks and three forced fumbles. He also returned a fumble 27 yards for a touchdown against Western Kentucky.

He completed his career with 21.5 sacks, which ranks second best in school history and fourth highest in conference history.

Professional career

NFL Draft
Carrington was drafted by the Buffalo Bills in the third round (72nd overall) of the 2010 NFL Draft.

Buffalo Bills
On July 19, 2010, Carrington signed a four-year contract with the Bills. At the start of the 2011 Training Camp, Carrington was moved to Outside Linebacker.

In 2012, Carrington blocked 4 kicks (3 field goals and an extra point) while playing special teams, a team record.

In 2013, following an injury against the New York Jets, Carrington was placed on injured reserve, effectively ending his season.

St Louis Rams
On March 25, 2014, he was signed by the St. Louis Rams.

Second stint with the Buffalo Bills
On May 5, 2015, Carrington re-signed with the Buffalo Bills. On November 30, 2015, he was placed on injured reserve.

Houston Texans
Carrington signed with the Texans. On August 23, 2016, Carrington was released by the Texans.

References

External links
 St. Louis Rams bio
 Buffalo Bills bio 
 Arkansas State Red Wolves bio

1987 births
Living people
African-American players of American football
American football defensive ends
American football linebackers
Arkansas State Red Wolves football players
Buffalo Bills players
Sportspeople from Tupelo, Mississippi
Players of American football from Mississippi
St. Louis Rams players
Houston Texans players
21st-century African-American sportspeople
20th-century African-American people